The Heinkel HE 18 was a sports aircraft built in Germany in the mid 1920s. It was a two-seat conventional low-wing monoplane. A development of the HE 3, it had a narrower fuselage than the HE3, having tandem seating instead of side-by-side. Also, its wings were braced by a pair of struts on each side, arranged in a V-shape with a single attachment point on each side of the upper fuselage, where the HE 3 had cantilever wings. The wings could be folded flat along the sides of the fuselage for transport or storage, and a choice of wheeled or float undercarriage was available. A roll-bar was available that could be fitted in order to protect the occupants in case of a roll-over on the ground.

Specifications (HE 18)

References
 
 

1920s German sport aircraft
HE 018
Low-wing aircraft
Single-engined tractor aircraft
Aircraft first flown in 1925